Baileya ophthalmica, the eyed baileya, is a nolid moth (family Nolidae). The species was first described by Achille Guenée in 1852. It is found in North America.

The MONA or Hodges number for Baileya ophthalmica is 8970.

References

Further reading

External links
 

Nolidae
Articles created by Qbugbot
Moths described in 1852